The Oriental and Pacific Boxing Federation (OPBF) is a professional boxing organization that sanctions title fights in the Asian and Pacific region.

History
Oriental boxing started in the Philippines in 1946 after the Spanish-American War. While America was stationed in the Philippines, boxing began to build up in popularity due to American influence. Many Filipinos who were inspired by boxing, moved to Honolulu, Hawaii to continue their careers.

In the year 1910 there was a Yujiro Watanabe, of Japan, a boxer-turned-promoter who laid important groundwork in developing the sport in Japan  and bridging language and cultural barriers with neighboring countries. Yujiro Watanabe flew to America in 1911-1916 to box and returned home to Japan in 1921 to form one of the first Oriental boxing groups known as the Japan Club. This club allowed boxing to gain more popularity in Japan during the post-war years.

The OPBF was later formed in 1954 by the Japanese, Korean, and Filipino boxing commissions. It was originally named the Orient Boxing Federation but changed to the Oriental and Pacific Boxing Federation when the Australian National Boxing Federation joined in 1977. In 1963, Australia, New Zealand and the Oceania countries were approved for membership. In November 1977, the organization was officially renamed to Oriental and Pacific Boxing Federation. The organization headquarters were moved from Australia to Japan in 2018.

The OPBF helped form the World Boxing Council in 1963 and is currently affiliated with that organization.

In January 2009, women's championships were established, across eleven weight classes (from atomweight to welterweight). Initially, women's title fights were contested in ten-round bouts, which was reduced to eight rounds in 2012.

On 30 March 2016, the OPBF Silver Championship was established, following a dispute between the Japanese and Philippines boxing commissions on whether an interim title should be established. WBC chairman Mauricio Suleiman suggested naming the title "Silver" to avoid detracting any prestige from the full title. Despite this, the JBC announced a policy of not allowing OPBF Silver matches to be contested in Japan.

In November 2018, the OPBF announced the establishment of domestic OPBF titles, which would certify national champions. The first OPBF national champion was crowned on 9 December 2018, when Dao Nguyen Ain Tuan won the OPBF Vietnam super lightweight title.

Members
15 national commissions and 3 regional commissions (Hong Kong, Guam and Hawaii).

 
 
 
 
  Hawaii

Controversies 
The OPBF ratings have been criticized numerous times. The ratings released in January 2005 had the undefeated #1 super flyweight Z Gorres passed up by three fighters, including a previously-unranked Prosper Matsuura jumping to #3, after an impressive win. Additionally, the undefeated Reynaldo Bautista dropped from #4 to #5 after a defense of his WBO Asia Pacific bantamweight title. The previously-unranked Japanese fighter Jun Toriumi catapulted to the #1 spot and won the title soon after.

The following year, a new batch of ratings drew further criticism. WBO Asia Pacific super featherweight champion Czar Amonsot, who was previously ranked #3, dropped out of the top 10 after knocking out Victor Mausul for the title and defeating Cristian Favela. Unranked Jimrex Jaca was moved to #1. Apart from this, former OPBF super featherweight champion Randy Suico had relinquished his title to move up to lightweight, and was immediately ranked at #1 in his new weight class in the new rankings. The previous #1, Shunsuke Ito, had just won the Japanese lightweight title by stopping his opponent in the second round and was in line for a OPBF title shot against reigning champion Chikashi Inada.

In September 2017, undefeated Filipino prospect Edward Heno won the vacant OPBF light flyweight title on his second attempt. However, he was stripped of the belt and dropped to number four in the rankings after he was unable to defend it at that year's OPBF convention in Puerto Princesa in November, even though the winner of a vacant belt normally gets 90 days to defend it.

Current OPBF title holders

Male

Female

Other regional WBC federations
North American Boxing Federation (NABF)
European Boxing Union (EBU)
Asian Boxing Council (ABCO)
African Boxing Union (ABU)
Caribbean Boxing Federation (CABOFE)
Central American Boxing Federation (FECARBOX)
CIS and Slovenian Boxing Bureau (CISBB)
South American Boxing Federation (FESUBOX)

See also
World Boxing Council
Australian National Boxing Federation

References

External links

Professional boxing organizations
Sports organizations established in 1952
Boxing in Asia
Boxing in Oceania
1952 establishments in Asia
1952 establishments in Oceania